Oligocladus patagonicus is a species of flowering plant in the family Apiaceae, native to west and central Argentina. It was first described in 1902 as Sanicula patagonica. It is the only species in the genus Oligocladus.

References

Apioideae